Max Otto Miller was an American film producer and inventor of the Miller Stereoscopic Process. It was an early 3-D process of making and projecting pictures, using a conventional camera lens with a concave spherical lens attached to increase field without increasing object distance. It included a special design for the aperture plate and projection of the picture through a double convexed spherical lens of lesser focal length. The method used 35 mm film printed single strip anaglyphic. It was used on films including the 1925 silent western The Ship of Souls. Miller also produced the 1924 film A Pair of Hellions. His son was director and photographer Max B. Miller.

References

External links

20th-century American inventors
Year of birth missing
Place of birth missing
Year of death missing